Landmark Books was a children's book series published by Random House from 1950 to 1970, featuring stories of significant people and events in American history written by popular authors at the time. The series expanded in 1953 to include world history as a sub-series called World Landmark Books, and a second sub-series of larger-format books illustrated with color artwork or black and white photographs was introduced in the 1960s as Landmark Giant, which would continue releasing new titles beyond the end of the main series until 1974. Select titles from the American and World series were reissued in paperback from the 1980s to the early 2000s.

Volumes in the initial run of the American, World, and Giant series were numbered, and a list of titles was printed on the inside of each book's dust jacket. The series would grow to include 122 American, 63 World, and 25 Giant volumes by noted authors like C. S. Forester, Robert Penn Warren, Pearl S. Buck, Quentin Reynolds, MacKinlay Kantor, Shirley Jackson, Daniel J. Boorstin, and many others.

A blurb printed on the jacket of later entries in the series by Millicent Taylor, former Education Editor for The Christian Science Monitor, described the Landmark Books as being intended for ages ten to fifteen, uniformly under 200 pages, and illustrated with maps and drawings.

David Spear, writing in the American Historical Association's news magazine, says that the series "lured an entire generation of young readers" to the history discipline, "including many of today's professional historians."

List of titles and authors

References

Further reading 
 
 

Children's history books
Random House books
Series of books